Radisson Substation is a large electrical substation located near Radisson on the Route de la Baie James highway. The switching station, owned by Hydro-Québec, is the largest substation in its power grid, covering an area of a massive 100 football fields. The power from these lines is either raised to AC 735 kV from AC 315 kV, statically inverted to high-voltage direct current (HVDC) +/- 450 kV, or unchanged (735 kV to 735 kV). The amount of electrical energy passing through the substation is 6,600 megawatts (MW).

See also
Hydro-Québec
Hydro-Québec's electricity transmission system
Quebec - New England Transmission

References

Converter stations
James Bay Project